In the NCAA Men's Division I Basketball Championship or the NCAA Women's Division I Basketball Championship, the "Elite Eight" comprises the final eight teams, representing the regional finals, or national quarterfinals. In Division I and Division III, the Elite Eight consists of the two teams in each of the four regional championship games. The winners advance to the Final Four.  Since 1997, when the NCAA trademarked the phrase, in Division II, the Elite Eight consists of the eight winners of the eight Division II regions.  Like the Division I Final Four, the Division II Elite Eight games are all held in one predetermined location.

In the men's Division I, the lowest-seeded team ever to reach this round in the modern 64 team tournament era is #15 seed Saint Peter's University in 2022.

Two #12 seeds have advanced to the Elite Eight: Missouri in 2002, and the Oregon State Beavers in 2021. 

Nine #11 seeds have advanced to the Elite Eight: LSU (1986), Loyola Marymount (1990), Temple (2001), George Mason (2006), Virginia Commonwealth (2011), Dayton (2014), Xavier (2017), Loyola Chicago (2018), and UCLA (2021).  There have only been four seasons where two double-digit seeded teams have made it to the Elite Eight: 1990 (10-seed Texas and 11-seed LMU); 2002 (12-seed Missouri and 10-seed Kent State); 2021, where both were from the same conference (12-seed Oregon State and 11-seed UCLA); and 2022 (10-seed Miami and 15-seed Saint Peter's).

On average, three of the four #1 seeds make it to the Elite Eight each year.  In men's play, the Elite Eight exists intact for less than 24 hours between the second Friday evening and the following Saturday afternoon of the tournament.  The Elite Eight also represents the halfway mark of the men's tournament since each qualifying team must win three rounds (games) to reach the national quarterfinals, with three rounds remaining to reach and win the national championship game.

Like "March Madness," the phrase "Elite Eight" originally referred to the Illinois High School Boys Basketball Championship, the single-elimination high school basketball tournament run by the Illinois High School Association. When the IHSA finals were reduced from sixteen to eight teams in 1956, a replacement nickname for Sweet Sixteen was needed, and Elite Eight won popular favor. The IHSA trademarked the term in 1995; the trademark rights are now held by the March Madness Athletic Association, a joint venture between the NCAA and IHSA formed after a 1996 court case allowed both organizations to use "March Madness" for their own tournaments.

The Elite Eight can also refer to the eight NCAA Division I baseball teams that reach the College World Series.

In addition, the term is often colloquially used to denote quarterfinalists in the four major North American professional sports; i.e., the teams that reach the American League Division Series and the National League Division Series in Major League Baseball, the Divisional Playoffs in either conference of the National Football League, and the conference semifinals in the National Basketball Association and the National Hockey League.

Notable Elite Eight teams in the men's Division I NCAA tournament
 During the first 12 years of the tournament (1939-50, inclusive) only eight teams competed, meaning every team that qualified in those years was an automatic "Elite Eight" team. 
 Idaho State in 1977, which defeated UCLA in the previous round to end the Bruins' streak of consecutive Final Four appearances at 10 to end the John Wooden-era dynasty
 11-seed LSU became the first and, to date, the only 11-seed to defeat the top three seeded team in its region to advance.
 11-seed Loyola Marymount in 1990. One of the team's stars, Hank Gathers, collapsed and died on the court during the WCC Tournament, and teammates (including Bo Kimble, who shot his first free throw of each tournament game left-handed) honored Gathers during the tournament.
 12-seed Missouri in 2002
 10-seed Kent State in 2002
 10-seed Providence College in 1997
 10-seed Gonzaga in 1999
 11-seed Temple finished the 2001 regular season on a remarkable run, winning the Atlantic-10 tournament behind play of Lynn Greer before succumbing to Michigan State.
 11-seed George Mason in 2006, which became the first 11-seed to advance to the Final Four since 1986, after defeating 1-seed Connecticut in overtime in the Elite Eight
 10-seed Davidson College in 2008
 11-seed Virginia Commonwealth in 2011 (the first "First Four" team to advance to the Final Four)
 11-seed Dayton in 2014
 10-seed Syracuse in 2016
 11-seed Xavier in 2017
 11-seed Loyola–Chicago in 2018
 12-seed Oregon State Beavers in 2021
 11-seed UCLA Bruins in 2021 (the second First Four team to advance to the Final Four)
 15-seed Saint Peter's in 2022 (first 15-seed team to advance to Elite Eight)
 10-seed Miami Hurricanes in 2022 (head coach Jim Larrañaga is the first to take 2 double digit seeded teams to the Elite 8 under different schools (was head coach of 11-seed George Mason in 2006))

References 

Sports terminology
NCAA Division I men's basketball tournament
NCAA Division I women's basketball tournament